The 1989–90 Scottish Premier Division season was won by Rangers, seven points ahead of Aberdeen. Dundee were relegated.

Table

Results

Matches 1–18
During matches 1-18 each team plays every other team twice (home and away).

Matches 19–36
During matches 19-36 each team plays every other team a further two times (home and away).

See also
Nine in a row

References
RSSSF

Scottish Premier Division seasons
1
Scot